The 1961–62 Allsvenskan was the 28th season of the top division of Swedish handball. 10 teams competed in the league. IK Heim won the league and claimed their fifth Swedish title. Örebro SK and Skövde AIK were relegated.

League table

References 

Swedish handball competitions